Miles per hour (mph, m.p.h., MPH, or mi/h) is a British imperial and United States customary unit of speed expressing the number of miles travelled in one hour. It is used in the United Kingdom, the United States, and a number of smaller countries, most of which are UK or US territories, or have close historical ties with the UK or US.

Usage

Road traffic
Speed limits and road traffic speeds are given in miles per hour in the following jurisdictions:
Antigua and Barbuda
Bahamas 
Belize 
Dominica 
Grenada 
Liberia (occasionally)
Marshall Islands
Micronesia
Palau
Saint Kitts and Nevis
Saint Lucia 
Saint Vincent and the Grenadines 
Samoa (along with kilometres per hour) 
United Kingdom
The following British Overseas Territories:
Anguilla
British Virgin Islands
British Indian Ocean Territory
Cayman Islands
Falkland Islands
Montserrat
Saint Helena, Ascension and Tristan da Cunha 
Turks and Caicos Islands
The Crown dependencies:
Bailiwick of Guernsey
Isle of Man
Jersey
United States
The following United States overseas dependencies:
American Samoa
Guam 
Northern Mariana Islands
Puerto Rico 
United States Virgin Islands

Rail networks 
Miles per hour is the unit used on the US, Canadian and Irish rail systems. Miles per hour is also used on British rail systems, excluding trams, some light metro systems, the Channel Tunnel and High Speed 1.

Nautical and aeronautical usage
Nautical and aeronautical applications favour the knot as a common unit of speed. (One knot is one nautical mile per hour, with a nautical mile being exactly 1,852 metres or about 6,076 feet.)

Other usage 
In some countries mph may be used to express the speed of delivery of a ball in sporting events such as cricket, tennis and baseball.

Conversions
{|
|-
|valign=top rowspan=4|1 mph
|=  (exactly)
|-
|=  (exactly)
|}

See also

Kilometres per hour
Acceleration
Velocity

References

Units of velocity
Imperial units
Customary units of measurement in the United States